Fox-1 homolog A, also known as ataxin 2-binding protein 1 (A2BP1) or hexaribonucleotide-binding protein 1 (HRNBP1) or RNA binding protein, fox-1 homolog (Rbfox1), is a protein that in humans is encoded by the RBFOX1  gene.

Function 

Rbfox1 has an RNA recognition motif that is highly conserved among RNA-binding proteins. Rbfox1, and the related protein Rbfox2, bind the consensus RNA sequence motif (U)GCAUG within introns to exert their functions as alternative splicing factors.

Additionally, the Rbfox1/A2BP1 protein binds to the C-terminus of ataxin-2, and may contribute to the restricted pathology of spinocerebellar ataxia type 2 (SCA2). Ataxin-2 is the gene product of the SCA2 gene which causes familial neurodegenerative diseases. Several alternatively spliced transcript variants have been found for this gene. Some of these variants localize to the nucleus and some other to the cytoplasm. Nuclear variants have a well-established role in tissue specific alternative splicing. Rbfox1 cytoplasmic variants modulate mRNA stability and translation. In stressed cells, Rbfox1 has been demonstrated to localize to cytoplasmic stress granules.

See also 
Alternative splicing
RNA-binding protein

References

Further reading 

 
 
 
 
 
 
 
 

Human proteins